The 2019–20 season was Lori FC's second season in the Armenian Premier League, and they will also participate in the  Armenian Cup. They finished the season in 5th position and reached the Quarterfinals of the Armenian Cup where they were knocked out by Urartu.

Season events
On 18 June 2019, David Campaña Piquer was appointed as the new manager of Lori on a contract until the summer of 2020.

On 5 July, Artyom Khachaturov signed a new one-year contract with Lori, leaving the club by mutual consent on 9 December.

On 12 March 2020, the Football Federation of Armenia announced that all Armenian Premier League games had been postponed until 23 March due to the COVID-19 pandemic.

On 2 June 2020, Lori announced that manager David Campaña and his assistants Francisco Compan, Jorge Gomez, Agustin Perez and Enrique Gil had all left the club as their contracts could not be extended due to travel restrictions in returning to Armenia due to the COVID-19 pandemic. Later the same day, Armen Sanamyan was announced as Lori's caretaker manager.

On 10 July, Lori announced that 17 of the players and staff had tested positive for COVID-19, and as a result the whole club was now isolating, as a result their lat game of the season, scheduled for 14 July against Ararat Yerevan was cancelled with the points not being awarded to either team.

Squad

Out on loan

Transfers

In

Loans in

Out

Loans out

Released

Friendlies

Competitions

Premier League

Regular season

Results summary

Results

Table

Championship round

Results summary

Results

Table

Armenian Cup

Statistics

Appearances and goals

|-
|colspan="14"|Players away on loan:

|-
|colspan="14"|Players who left Lori during the season:

|}

Goal scorers

Clean sheets

Disciplinary Record

References

Lori FC seasons
Lori